Dream Lake is a small freshwater lake located within the Alpine Lakes Wilderness in a valley on the norther slope of Keechelus Ridge between Keechelus Lake and Kachess Lake in Kittitas County, Washington, United States. Big Creek, a tributary to the Taylor River, exits Dream Lake into a canyon that produces Big Creek Falls. Because of its proximity to Rampart Ridge, Interstate 90 and the cirque of Keechelus Ridge a short distance to the south, the lake is a popular area for hiking, swimming, and fishing brook trout, golden trout and rainbow trout. Access to Baker Lake is provided through Keechelus Ridge off Forest Road 126. A short distance southwest is Microwave Hill, which is named because of a microwave radio tower on its summit.

See also 
 List of lakes of the Alpine Lakes Wilderness

References 

Lakes of Kittitas County, Washington
Lakes of the Alpine Lakes Wilderness
Okanogan National Forest